The Battle of Bangkusay, on June 3, 1571, was a naval engagement that marked the last resistance by locals to the Spanish Empire's occupation and colonization of the Pasig River delta, which had been the site of the indigenous polities of Rajahnate of Maynila and Tondo.

Tarik Sulayman, the chief of Macabebes, refused to ally with the Spanish and decided to mount an attack at Bangkusay Channel on Spanish forces, led by Miguel López de Legazpi. Sulayman's forces were defeated, and Sulayman himself was killed. The Spanish victory in Bangkusay and Legazpi's alliance with Lakandula of Tondo, enabled the Spaniards to establish themselves throughout the city and its neighboring towns.

Historical Account

Background
Miguel López de Legazpi was searching for a suitable place to establish the Spanish colonial capital after being forced to leave first Cebu and then Iloilo by Portuguese pirates. In 1570, Martin de Goiti and Captain Juan de Salcedo, with food stocks diminishing, discovered a rich  kingdom on Luzon and saw its potential. De Goiti anchored at Cavite, and tried to establish his authority peaceably by sending a message of friendship to Maynila. Rajah Sulayman, its ruler, was willing to accept the friendship that the Spaniards were offering, but did not want to submit to its sovereignty. Thus, Sulayman declared war. As a result, De Goiti and his army attacked Maynila in June 1570. After a stout fight, Sulayman and his men were forced to flee uphill. After the Spaniards had left, the natives returned.

In 1571, the Spaniards returned with their entire force consisting of 280 Spaniards and 600 native allies, this time led by Legazpi himself. Seeing the Spanish approaching, the natives set the city on fire and fled to Tondo. The Spaniards occupied the ruins of Maynila and established a settlement there. On May 19, 1571, Legaspi gave the title "city" to the colony of Manila. The title was certified on June 19, 1572.

A Kapampangan leader of the Macabebe tribe, later identified as Tarik Sulayman, refused to submit to the Spaniards and, after failing to gain the support of the chieftains of Maynila, Tondo (Lakandula, Matanda), and nearby old settlements of the present-day Bulacan province, mostly Hagonoy, Bulacan, gathered a force composed of Bulacan "Kapampangan" and Kapampangan warriors.

Battle
On June 3, 1571, Tarik Sulayman, supported by Rajah Sulayman, led his troops down the Pampanga River and fought the battle in the bay of Bangkusay, off the port of Tondo.

The Spanish ships, led by Martin de Goiti, were ordered to be fastened two-by-two which created a solid mass formation which seemed to be an easy target. The native warships were lured by this deception and they surrounded the Spanish. The Spanish, surrounded by the native boats, opened fire and the native fleet was scattered and destroyed.

The chief who died at Bangkusay is sometimes identified as Rajah Sulayman of the Rajahnate of Maynila, Lakandula's contemporary. However, it is clear in the Spanish records that Rajah Sulayman was able to survive the battle by escaping to Pampanga and it was the nameless Kapampangan chief, identified as Tarik Sulayman, that fell in the battle.

Aftermath
Legazpi was able to establish a municipal government for Manila on June 24, 1571, which eventually became the capital of the entire Spanish East Indies colony and subsequently the capital of the Philippines.

The initial population of the city was around 250.

See also
Rajah Matanda
Pampanga
Tarik Sulayman
Philippine revolts against Spain

Sources

Further reading

Conflicts in 1571
1571 in the Philippines
Bangkusay Channel 1571
Military history of the Philippines
History of the Philippines (1565–1898)
History of the Philippines (900–1565)
History of Manila